Ulvi Mammadov (born 10 February 1999) is an Azerbaijani karateka, silver and bronze medalist of the World champion, World and European Championships, winner and prize-winner of international tournaments, multiple champion of Azerbaijan, 1 Dan black belt,Due to his high sports results, he was awarded the honorary title of athlete of 2022 in Azerbaijan by the World Fudokan Federation.

Early life
World champion,  silver and bronze medalist of the World and European Championships, winner and prize-winner of international tournaments, multiple champion of Azerbaijan, master of the black belt from the 1st Ulvi Mammadov Razim oglu February 10 1999 He was born in Sumgayit, Republic of Azerbaijan.

 Due to his high sports results, he was awarded the honorary title of athlete of 2022 in Azerbaijan by the World Fudokan Federation.

References

External links

 Ulvi Mammadov was awarded the honorary title "ATHLETE OF THE YEAR 2022"

Ulvi Mammadov was awarded a silver medal at the world championship
There was a meeting with the winners and prize-winners of the European Championship (mys.gov.az
The Ministry of Youth and Sports of the Republic of Azerbaijan held a meeting with the winners and prize-winners of the 25th European Fudokan Championship
The World Shotokan Federation held the world championship in Turkey - REAL TV

1999 births
Living people
Azerbaijani male karateka
Azerbaijani martial artists
Azerbaijani sportsmen